The name Ora has been used for seven tropical cyclones in the northwest Pacific Ocean:

 Typhoon Ora (1951) (T5113) – approached the Philippines
 Typhoon Ora (1963) (T6321, 39W)
 Severe Tropical Storm Ora (1966) (T6608, 08W, Loleng) – struck China
 Typhoon Ora (1968) (T6827, 32W, Toyang) – struck the Philippines
 Typhoon Ora (1972) (T7205, 06W, Konsing)- struck the Philippines and China
 Typhoon Ora (1975) (T7504, 06W) – struck China
 Typhoon Ora (1978) (T7824, 25W, Aning) – approached Taiwan

Pacific typhoon set index articles